Belu Zilber (born Herbert Zilber; October 14, 1901–February 1978) was a Romanian communist activist.

Born into a Jewish family in Târgu Frumos, Iași County, he adhered to the Bolshevik movement while still an adolescent. Because he participated in the typographers' demonstration of December 13, 1918, he was expelled from every educational institution in his native country by the authorities of the Kingdom of Romania. He continued his high school education in Paris and began but did not complete studies at the polytechnic division of the University of Grenoble. He returned to Romania in 1922 and was hired as an expert at the War Ministry. He was recruited as a Soviet spy in Vienna in 1928; arrested in Romania in December 1930, he agreed to become an informant for the Siguranța secret police. At his trial for espionage on the Soviets' behalf, he was initially sentenced to five years at hard labor, but was retried and acquitted in 1932.

That year, he began working at an institute led by Virgil Madgearu, where he remained until 1947. During the rest of the decade, Zilber, characterized as "cultured, voluble and ubiquitous", and known in the cultural circles of Bucharest, led an underground life as a member of the banned Romanian Communist Party working to destroy "bourgeois democracy", an informer and a spy, but also lived the seemingly normal life of a bourgeois desirous of prosperity. Following the Coup of August 1944, when the Communist Party was made legal, he became the closest collaborator of his friend Lucrețiu Pătrășcanu, who became Justice Minister. Zilber was arrested in 1948, together with Pătrășcanu, and imprisoned following a show trial. He was released in 1964. He died in 1978. Following incineration at the Cenușa crematorium, his ashes were taken to Cișmigiu Gardens, where they were scattered under a bush near the bust of George Panu, among the magnolias he often admired. His memoirs appeared posthumously in 1997, some years after the 1989 fall of the regime.

Notes

References
Mihaela Grancea, Reprezentări ale morții în România epocii comuniste. Casa Cărții de Știință, Cluj-Napoca, 2008, 
Stelian Tănase, Clienții lu' tanti varvara: istorii clandestine. Humanitas, Bucharest, 2005, 

1901 births
1978 deaths
Romanian communists
Romanian expatriates in France
People convicted of spying for the Soviet Union
People detained by the Siguranța
People detained by the Securitate
Romanian prisoners and detainees
20th-century memoirists
Romanian memoirists
People from Târgu Frumos
Romanian Jews